The 2007–08 QMJHL season was the 39th season in the history of the Quebec Major Junior Hockey League. At the season-opening press conference, the QMJHL announced in partnership with Telus that all 630 regular season games would be available by Internet broadcast. The regular season started on September 13, 2007, and concluded on March 16, 2008. Eighteen teams played seventy games each. The Rouyn-Noranda Huskies finished first overall in the regular season winning their first Jean Rougeau Trophy. They would go on to win 12-straight playoff games before losing in five games in the finals to the Gatineau Olympiques, who captured their seventh President's Cup, and third in the last six seasons.

Final standings
Note: GP = Games played; W = Wins; L = Losses; OTL = Overtime loss; SL = Shootout loss; PTS = Points; GF = Goals for; GA = Goals against; x = Clinched playoff berth; y = Clinched division title

Complete List of Standings.

Scoring leaders

Note: GP = Games played; G = Goals; A = Assists; Pts = Points; PIM = Penalty minutes

Goaltending leaders
Note: GP = Games played; Mins = Minutes played; W = Wins; L = Losses; GA = Goals allowed; SO = Shutouts; GAA = Goals against average

Canada-Russia Challenge
The 2007 ADT Canada-Russia Challenge was hosted by the Chicoutimi Saguenéens and the Gatineau Olympiques. On November 19, 2007, the Russian Selects defeated the QMJHL All-stars 6–4 at the Centre Georges-Vézina. On November 21, 2007, the QMJHL All-stars defeated the Russian Selects 3–2 at the Robert Guertin Centre. Since the tournament began in 2003, the QMJHL All-stars have won six games, the Russian Selects have four wins.

Playoffs
The top nine teams from the Telus division, and top seven teams from the Eastern division qualified for the playoffs. The ninth place team in the Telus division qualified in the Eastern division, and ranked by regular season points. All series will be best-of-seven. Divisions will cross over in the semifinals.

Overview

†Victoriaville seeded 8th in Eastern division.

Division quarterfinals

Telus Division

Eastern Division

Division semifinals

Telus Division

Eastern Division

Finals

QMJHL Championship

All-star teams
First team
 Goaltender - Kevin Desfossés, Quebec Remparts
 Defence - Marc-André Bourdon, Rouyn-Noranda & Marc-André Dorion, Baie-Comeau  
 Left winger - Stefano Giliati, Lewiston Maineiacs
 Centreman - Francis Paré, Chicoutimi Saguenéens 
 Right winger - Claude Giroux, Gatineau Olympiques

Second team  
 Goaltender - Marco Cousineau, Baie-Comeau Drakkar
 Defence - Kevin Marshall, Lewiston Maineiacs & Ivan Vishnevskiy, Rouyn-Noranda Huskies
 Left winger - Michaël Dubuc, Rouyn-Noranda Huskies 
 Centreman - Mathieu Perreault, Acadie-Bathurst Titan
 Right winger - Jakub Voracek, Halifax Mooseheads

Rookie team 
 Goaltender - Olivier Roy, Cape Breton Screaming Eagles
 Defence - Simon Després, Saint John Sea Dogs & Samuel Groulx, Quebec Remparts 
 Left winger - Nicolas Deschamps, Chicoutimi Saguenéens
 Centreman - Tomas Knotek, Halifax Mooseheads
 Right winger - Jacob Lagacé, Chicoutimi Saguenéens
 Hall of Fame opens doors to four new all-time greats amidst the Golden Puck Awards Gala.

Trophies and awards
Team
President's Cup - Playoff Champions: Gatineau Olympiques
Jean Rougeau Trophy - Regular Season Champions: Rouyn-Noranda Huskies
Luc Robitaille Trophy - Team that scored the most goals: Rouyn-Noranda Huskies
Robert Lebel Trophy - Team with best GAA: Chicoutimi Saguenéens

Player
Michel Brière Memorial Trophy - Most Valuable Player: Francis Paré, Chicoutimi Saguenéens
Jean Béliveau Trophy - Top Scorer: Mathieu Perreault, Acadie-Bathurst Titan
Guy Lafleur Trophy - Playoff MVP : Claude Giroux, Gatineau Olympiques
Telus Cup – Offensive - Offensive Player of the Year 
Telus Cup – Defensive - Defensive Player of the Year
Jacques Plante Memorial Trophy - Best GAA: Bobby Nadeau, Chicoutimi Saguenéens
Guy Carbonneau Trophy - Best Defensive Forward: Olivier Fortier, Rimouski Océanic
Emile Bouchard Trophy - Defenceman of the Year: Marc-André Bourdon, Rouyn-Noranda Huskies
Kevin Lowe Trophy - Best Defensive Defenceman: Mathieu Bolduc, Chicoutimi Saguenéens   
Mike Bossy Trophy - Best Pro Prospect: Mikhail Stefanovich, Quebec Remparts
RDS Cup - Rookie of the Year: Olivier Roy, Cape Breton Screaming Eagles
Michel Bergeron Trophy - Offensive Rookie of the Year: Nicolas Deschamps, Chicoutimi Saguenéens
Raymond Lagacé Trophy - Defensive Rookie of the Year: Olivier Roy, Cape Breton Screaming Eagles
Frank J. Selke Memorial Trophy - Most sportsmanlike player: Cédric Lalonde-McNicoll, Shawinigan Cataractes
QMJHL Humanitarian of the Year - Humanitarian of the Year: Chris Morehouse, Moncton Wildcats
Marcel Robert Trophy - Best Scholastic Player: Robert Slaney, Cape Breton Screaming Eagles
Paul Dumont Trophy - Personality of the Year: Martin Mondou, Shawinigan Cataractes

Executive
Ron Lapointe Trophy - Coach of the Year: Pascal Vincent, Cape Breton Screaming Eagles
Maurice Filion Trophy - General Manager of the Year: Jacques Beaulieu, Saint John Sea Dogs 
John Horman Trophy - Executive of the Year: Mario Arsenault, Rimouski Océanic  
Jean Sawyer Trophy - Marketing Director of the Year: Yves Bonneau, Victoriaville Tigres

See also
2008 Memorial Cup
2008 NHL Entry Draft
2007–08 OHL season
2007–08 WHL season

References

External links
 Official QMJHL Website
 www.hockeydb.com/

QMJHL
Quebec Major Junior Hockey League seasons